Groucho glasses, also known as nose glasses, the beaglepuss, or the GM 20/20s are a humorous novelty disguise which function as a caricature of the stage makeup used by the comedian Groucho Marx in his movies and vaudeville performances.  They typically consist of black frames (either round or horn-rimmed) with attached features including bushy eyebrows, a large plastic nose, bushy moustache, and sometimes a plastic cigar. Considered one of the most iconic and widely used of all novelty items in the world, Groucho glasses were marketed as early as the 1940s and are instantly recognizable to people throughout the world. The glasses are often used as a shorthand for slapstick and are depicted in the Disguised Face (🥸) emoji.

References

External links
 
 

Novelty items
Party equipment
Cultural depictions of the Marx Brothers
Masks in the Americas

de:Scherzbrille